Zhaungzhai railway station is a railway station in Cao County, Heze, Shandong, China.

History
The station opened on 26 December 2021 with the Qufu to Zhuangzhai section of the Rizhao–Lankao high-speed railway. The initial service was five daily arrivals and five daily departures.

References 

Railway stations in Shandong
Railway stations in China opened in 2021